The 2011 Levene Gouldin & Thompson Tennis Challenger was a professional tennis tournament played on hard courts. It was the 18th edition of the tournament which was part of the 2011 ATP Challenger Tour. It took place in Binghamton, NY United States between 8 and 14 August 2011.

Singles main-draw entrants

Seeds

 1 Rankings are as of August 1, 2011.

Other entrants
The following players received wildcards into the singles main draw:
  Alexander Domijan
  Nicolás Massú
  Tennys Sandgren
  Rhyne Williams

The following players received entry from the qualifying draw:
  Adam El Mihdawy
  Luka Gregorc
  Dimitar Kutrovsky
  Benjamin Mitchell

The following player received entry as a lucky loser into the singles main draw:
  Bruno Semenzato

Champions

Singles

 Paul Capdeville def.  Wayne Odesnik, 7–6(7–4), 6–3

Doubles

 Juan Sebastián Cabal /  Robert Farah def.  Treat Conrad Huey /  Frederik Nielsen, 6–4, 6–3

External links
Official Website
ITF Search 
ATP official site